Evelyn Waugh (1903–1966) was a British writer, journalist and reviewer, generally considered one of the leading English prose writers of the 20th century. The following lists his fiction, travel and biographical works, together with selected articles and reviews.

Juvenilia and undergraduate writing

Novels

Short fiction

Travel writing

Biography and autobiography

Miscellaneous works

Essays, reviews and journalism
The Essays, Articles and Reviews of Evelyn Waugh (Ed. Donat Gallagher, Methuen, London 1988) reprints the texts of more than 200 pieces by Waugh, published in the period 1917 to 1965. More than 300 further titles are listed but not reprinted. In his Life of Evelyn Waugh, Douglas Lane Patey provides a list of the more significant pieces.

1917: "In Defence of Cubism" (Drama and Design, November 1917); Waugh's first published article
1921: "The Youngest Generation"
1926: "P.R.B."
1929: "The War and the Younger Generation" (Spectator, 13 April 1929)
1930: "Converted to Rome" (Daily Express, 20 October 1930)
1930: "Ethiopia Today: Romance and reality" (The Times, 22 December 1930)
1932: "Why Glorify Youth?" (Woman's Journal, March 1932)
1933: An Open Letter to the Cardinal Archbishop of Westminster"
1941: "Commando Raid on Bardia"
1946: "Fan Fare" (Life, 8 April 1946)
1946: "What to do with the Upper Classes" (Town and Country, September 1946)
1947: "Why Hollywood is a Term of Disparagement" (The Daily Telegraph, 30 April 1947)
1947: "Death in Hollywood"
1949: "Come Inside" (in The Road to Damascus, ed. John A. O'Brien, New York and London 1949)
1949: "The American Epoch in the Catholic Church" (Life [Chicago], 19 September 1949)
1952: "Our Guest of Dishonour" (Sunday Express 30 November 1952)
1953: "Mr Waugh Replies" (Spectator, 3 July 1953)
1955: "Awake My Soul! It is a Lord" (Spectator, 8 July 1955)
1957: "Anything Wrong with Priestley?" (Spectator, 13 September 1957)
1959: "I See Nothing but Boredom...Everywhere" (Daily Mail, 28 December 1959)
1961: "An Act of Homage and Reparation to P. G. Wodehouse" (Radio broadcast, BBC, 15 July 1961; Printed in Sunday Times, 16 July 1961)
1962: "Sloth" (Sunday Times, 7 January 1962 in The Seven Deadly Sins series)
1962: "Eldorado Revisited" (National Review 9 October 1962)
1962: "The Same Again, Please" (Spectator, 23 November 1962)

References

Sources

Bibliographies by writer
Bibliographies of British writers
Works by Evelyn Waugh
Journalism bibliographies